The Sylvester Smith Farmstead is a historic farmstead in rural Izard County, Arkansas. The central feature of the farmstead is a single story Plain-Traditional wood-frame house, built in 1922 by Sylvester Smith, a prominent local farmer who also served as the local railroad telegrapher and agent. Smith built a barn, chicken house, smokehouse, and corn crib the following year, and the complex grew in later years to include a garage and privy. It is one of the best-preserved and least-altered farmsteads of the period in the county.

The property was listed on the National Register of Historic Places in 1992.

See also
National Register of Historic Places listings in Izard County, Arkansas

References

Houses on the National Register of Historic Places in Arkansas
Houses completed in 1922
Houses in Izard County, Arkansas
National Register of Historic Places in Izard County, Arkansas
1922 establishments in Arkansas
Farms on the National Register of Historic Places in Arkansas